John Smith Hurt (March 8, 1893 – November 2, 1966), better known as Mississippi John Hurt, was an American country blues singer and guitarist.

Raised in Avalon, Mississippi, Hurt taught himself to play the guitar around the age of nine. He worked as a sharecropper and began playing at dances and parties, singing to a melodious fingerpicked accompaniment. His first recordings, made for Okeh Records in 1928, were commercial failures, and he continued to work as a farmer.

Dick Spottswood and Tom Hoskins, a blues enthusiast, located Hurt in 1963 and persuaded him to move to Washington, D.C. He was recorded by the Library of Congress in 1964. This helped further the American folk music revival, which led to the rediscovery of many other bluesmen of Hurt's era. Hurt performed on the university and coffeehouse concert circuit with other Delta blues musicians who were brought out of retirement. He also recorded several albums for Vanguard Records.

Hurt returned to Grenada in 1966, where he died at the age of 73. 

Material recorded by him has been re-released by many record labels. His songs have been recorded by Bob Dylan, Dave Van Ronk, Jerry Garcia, Beck, Doc Watson, John McCutcheon, Taj Mahal, Bruce Cockburn, David Johansen, Bill Morrissey, Gillian Welch, The Be Good Tanyas, Josh Ritter, Chris Smither, Guthrie Thomas, Parsonsfield, and Rory Block.

Biography

Early years
Hurt was born in Teoc, Carroll County, Mississippi, and raised in Avalon, Mississippi. He taught himself to play guitar at the age of nine, stealthily playing the guitar of William Henry Carson, a friend of his mother Mary Jane's, who often stayed at the Hurt home while courting a woman who lived nearby. As a youth, he played old-time music for friends and at dances. He worked as a farmhand and sharecropper into the 1920s.

His fast, highly syncopated style of playing was meant for dancing. On occasion, a medicine show came through the area. Hurt recalled that one wanted to hire him: "One of them wanted me, but I said no because I just never wanted to get away from home." In 1923, he played with the fiddle player Willie Narmour as a substitute for Narmour's regular partner, Shell Smith.

First recordings
When Narmour got a chance to record for Okeh Records as a prize for winning first place in a 1928 fiddle contest, he recommended Hurt to Okeh producer Tommy Rockwell.  After auditioning "Monday Morning Blues" at his home, Hurt took part in two recording sessions, in Memphis and New York City. While in Memphis, he recalled seeing "many, many blues singers ... Lonnie Johnson, Blind Lemon Jefferson, Bessie Smith, and lots, lots more." Hurt described his first recording session:

Hurt attempted further negotiations with Okeh to record again, but his records were commercial failures. Okeh went out of business during the Great Depression, and Hurt returned to Avalon and obscurity, working as a sharecropper and playing at local parties and dances.

Rediscovery and death 

Hurt's renditions of "Frankie" and "Spike Driver Blues" were included in The Anthology of American Folk Music in 1952 which generated considerable interest in locating him. When a copy of "Avalon Blues" was discovered in 1963, it led musicologist Dick Spottswood to locate Avalon, Mississippi, in an atlas, and ask Tom Hoskins, who was traveling that way, to enquire after Hurt.

Upon locating Hurt, Hoskins persuaded him to perform several songs, to ensure that he was genuine. Hoskins was convinced and, seeing that Hurt's guitar playing skills were still intact, encouraged him to move to Washington, D.C., and perform for a broader audience. His performance at the 1963 Newport Folk Festival caused his star to rise in the folk revival occurring at that time. Soon after, in 1964, he recorded live for radio in Massachusetts with Skip James.

For a few short years, Hurt performed extensively at colleges, concert halls, and coffeehouses and appeared on The Tonight Show Starring Johnny Carson. He also recorded three albums for Vanguard Records. Much of his repertoire was also recorded for the Library of Congress. His fans particularly liked the ragtime songs "Salty Dog" and "Candy Man" and the blues ballads "Spike Driver Blues" (a variant of "John Henry") and "Frankie".

Hurt's influence spanned several music genres, including blues, spirituals, country, bluegrass, folk, and contemporary rock and roll. A soft-spoken man, his nature was reflected in the work, which consisted of a mellow mix of country, blues, and old-time music.

Hurt died on November 2, 1966, of a heart attack, in hospital at Grenada, Mississippi. His last recordings had been done at a hotel in New York City in February and July of that year, and were not released until 1972 on the Vanguard LP Last Sessions.

Style
Hurt used a fast, syncopated fingerpicking style of guitar playing that he taught himself. He was influenced by few other musicians, among whom was an elderly, unrecorded blues singer from the area where he lived, Rufus Hanks, who played twelve-string guitar and harmonica. According to the music critic Robert Christgau, "the school of John Fahey proceeded from his finger-picking, and while he's not the only quietly conversational singer in the modern folk tradition, no one else has talked the blues with such delicacy or restraint."

Tributes

There is a memorial to Hurt in Avalon, Mississippi. It is parallel to RR2, the rural road on which he grew up.

The singer-songwriter Tom Paxton, who met Hurt and played on the same bill with him at the Gaslight in Greenwich Village around 1963, wrote and recorded a song about him in 1977, "Did You Hear John Hurt?".

The first track of John Fahey's 1968 solo acoustic guitar album Requia is "Requiem for John Hurt". Fahey's posthumous live album, The Great Santa Barbara Oil Slick, also features a version of the piece, entitled "Requiem for Mississippi John Hurt".

Norman Greenbaum's eclectic minor hit, "Gondoliers, Shakespeares, Overseers, Playboys And Bums" refers to Mississippi John Hurt singing the blues.

The British folk and blues artist Wizz Jones recorded a tribute song, "Mississippi John", for his 1977 album Magical Flight.

The Delta blues artist Rory Block recorded the album Avalon: A Tribute to Mississippi John Hurt, released in 2013 as part of her "Mentor Series".

The New England singer-songwriter Bill Morrissey released the Grammy-nominated album Songs of Mississippi John Hurt in 1999.

In 2017, John Hurt's life story was told in the documentary series American Epic. The film featured footage of Hurt performing and being interviewed, and improved restorations of his 1920s recordings. Director Bernard MacMahon stated that Hurt "was the inspiration for American Epic". Hurt's life was profiled in the accompanying book, American Epic: The First Time America Heard Itself.

Discography
This section was compiled from three sources.

78-rpm releases
 "Frankie" / "Nobody's Dirty Business" (Okeh Records, Okeh 8560), 1928
 "Stack O' Lee" / "Candy Man Blues" (Okeh Records, OKeh 8654), 1928
 "Blessed Be the Name" / "Praying on the Old Camp Ground" (Okeh Records, OKeh 8666), 1928
 "Blue Harvest Blues" / "Spike Driver Blues" (Okeh Records, OKeh 8692), 1928
 "Louis Collins" / "Got the Blues (Can't Be Satisfied)" (Okeh Records, OKeh 8724), 1928
 "Ain't No Tellin'" / "Avalon Blues" (Okeh Records, OKeh 8759), 1928

Albums 
 Folk Songs and Blues (Piedmont Records, PLP 13157), 1963
 Worried Blues, live recordings (Piedmont Records, PLP 13161), 1964
 Today! (Vanguard Records, VSD-79220), 1966
 The Immortal Mississippi John Hurt (Vanguard Records, VSD-79248), 1967
 The Best of Mississippi John Hurt, live recording from Oberlin College, April 15, 1965 (Vanguard Records, VSD-19/20), 1970
 Last Sessions (Vanguard Records, VSD-79327), 1972
 Volume One of a Legacy, live recordings (Piedmont Records, CLPS 1068), 1975
 Monday Morning Blues: The Library of Congress Recordings, vol. 1 (Flyright Records, FLYLP 553), 1980
 Avalon Blues: The Library of Congress Recordings, vol. 2 (Heritage Records, HT-301), 1982
 Satisfied, live recordings (Quicksilver Intermedia, QS 5007), 1982
 The Candy Man, live recordings (Quicksilver Intermedia, QS 5042), 1982
 Sacred and Secular: The Library of Congress Recordings, vol. 3 (Heritage Records, HT-320), 1988
 Avalon Blues (Flyright Records, FLYCD 06), 1989
 Memorial Anthology, live recordings (Genes Records, GCD 9906/7), 1993

Selected compilation albums
 The Original 1928 Recordings (Spokane Records, SPL 1001), 1971
 1928: Stack O' Lee Blues – His First Recordings (Biograph Records, BLP C4), 1972
 1928 Sessions (Yazoo Records, L 1065), 1979
 Satisfying Blues (Collectables Records, VCL 5529), 1995
 Avalon Blues: The Complete 1928 Okeh Recordings (Columbia Records, CK64986), 1996
 Rediscovered (Vanguard Records, CD 79519), 1998
 The Complete Recordings (Vanguard Records, CD 70181–2), 1998
 Candy Man Blues: The Complete 1928 Sessions (Snapper Music, SBLUECD 010), 2004
 American Epic: The Best of Mississippi John Hurt (Lo-Max / Sony Legacy / Third Man, TMR-459), 2017

Notes

Further reading
 Ratcliffe, Philip R. (2011). Mississippi John Hurt: His Life, His Times, His Blues. Jackson: University Press of Mississippi.

References

External links

 Mississippi John Hurt Foundation, official website, includes information about the annual Mississippi John Hurt Music Festival in Avalon, Mississippi. 
 Mississippi John Hurt Museum, official website. 
 Mississippi John Hurt News. Website run by Hurt's grandnephew Fred Bolden, with forums and discussions open to the public.
 Illustrated Mississippi John Hurt discography
 
 [ Allmusic]
 
 
 Mississippi John Hurt's "Stackolee", Recording, sheet music, and guitar tab.

1890s births
1966 deaths
American folk singers
American blues guitarists
American male guitarists
Blues musicians from Mississippi
Blues revival musicians
American blues singer-songwriters
Delta blues musicians
Country blues musicians
Country blues singers
Fingerstyle guitarists
Okeh Records artists
People from Carroll County, Mississippi
Songster musicians
Vanguard Records artists
20th-century American guitarists
Singer-songwriters from Mississippi
Guitarists from Mississippi
African-American male singer-songwriters
African-American guitarists
20th-century African-American male singers